Major Karl Waldemar Ritscherle (1 May 1898 – 24 August 1940) was a World War I flying ace credited with eight aerial victories. He served again in the World War II Luftwaffe, and was killed in action when his Heinkel 111 was shot down and fell into Abberton Reservoir.

Biography
Karl Waldemar Ritscherle was born in Karlsruhe, the Grand Duchy of Baden, in the German Empire on 1 May 1898. He enlisted in Baden's Badisches Leib-Dragoner Regiment No. 20 on 5 September 1914, at 16 years of age. He went off to serve on the Eastern Front. He was promoted to Unteroffizier on 21 June 1915. On 6 September 1916, he was awarded the Iron Cross Second Class. On 24 December 1916, when he was promoted to Vizewachtmeister, he was still only 18 years old.

In December 1916, he reported to Fliegerersatz-Abteilung (Replacement Detachment) 11 in Breslau. There he learned aerial gunnery, which got him posted to aerial observer duty aboard the Aviatik C.IIIs of Schutzstaffel (Protection Squadron) 8 on 16 April 1917. He scored his first aerial victory on 1 October 1917, when he downed a French Spad VII southeast of Fort Malmaison, France. On 8 November, he was credited with a second Spad, destroyed over Presles-et-Thierny. One week later, he was awarded the First Class Iron Cross. On 8 December 1917, his native Baden awarded him the Military Karl-Friedrich Merit Medal. On 23 December, he scored his third aerial victory by shooting down a Sopwith two-seater over Chaillevois. On 27 December 1917, he was commissioned as a Leutnant.

On 7 January 1918, he was transferred to Fliegerersatz-Abteilung (Replacement Detachment) 1 as an instructor; he also learned to fly during this posting. On 22 June 1918, he was sent to a fighter squadron, Jagdstaffel 60, as a Fokker D.VII pilot. His aircraft bore the black and white checkerboard markings common to the elevators of Jasta 60 airplanes; his personal insignia was a three-pointed "star" on a white square painted on the side of the fuselage. He would use this machine to destroy four more Spads and a French observation balloon between 7 August and 3 October 1918. He was rewarded with the Knight's Cross with Swords of the Order of the Zahringer Lion on 18 September.

Ritscherle survived the war, and returned to duty for World War II ranked as a major. During the Battle of Britain, he was aboard a Heinkel 111 as an observer of 9/KG53 that was shot down at 1600 hours on 24 August 1940 by Sgt W.L. Dymond of No. 111 Squadron RAF. He bailed out, but drowned in the South Essex waterworks, aged 42.
He is buried at Cannock Chase German Military Cemetery, Staffordshire, England in a joint grave (Block 9, Row 5, Grave 27) with his colleague Feldwebel Erich Salomo, the aircraft's gunner, who was initially wounded and then killed when the aircraft dived into the ground.

Sources of information

References
 Norman Franks, Frank W. Bailey, Russell Guest. Above the Lines: The Aces and Fighter Units of the German Air Service, Naval Air Service and Flanders Marine Corps, 1914–1918. Grub Street, 1993. , .

1898 births
1940 deaths
Military personnel from Karlsruhe
People from the Grand Duchy of Baden
Military personnel of the Grand Duchy of Baden
Prussian Army personnel
Luftstreitkräfte personnel
German World War I flying aces
Recipients of the Iron Cross (1914), 1st class
Luftwaffe personnel of World War II
Aviators killed by being shot down
Burials at Cannock Chase German Military Cemetery
Luftwaffe personnel killed in World War II